Brigitte Reid (née Bittner; born 22 September 1955) is a Canadian athlete. She competed in the women's high jump at the 1984 Summer Olympics.

References

1955 births
Living people
Athletes (track and field) at the 1974 British Commonwealth Games
Athletes (track and field) at the 1984 Summer Olympics
Canadian female high jumpers
Olympic track and field athletes of Canada
Commonwealth Games medallists in athletics
Commonwealth Games bronze medallists for Canada
Medallists at the 1974 British Commonwealth Games